Super Low Altitude Test Satellite (SLATS) or Tsubame was a JAXA satellite intended to demonstrate operations in very low Earth orbit (VLEO, below 200 km), using ion engines to counteract aerodynamic drag from the Earth's atmosphere which is substantial at such lower orbital altitudes. It was launched on 23 December 2017, and decommissioned on 1 October 2019.

The spacecraft was equipped with sensors to determine atomic oxygen density, an exposure facility to measure material degradation in the 200 km orbit, and a small camera. Initial designs had conventional, though slightly canted, solar panels (compare to the aerodynamic shape and on-body solar panels of GOCE, which flew in a 255 km orbit). SLATS received the nickname Tsubame (Japanese for barn swallow) on 14 July 2017. According to JAXA, this name was chosen as the thin, elongated satellite in super low orbit with a set of solar array wings was reminiscent of a small swallow flying low.

SLATS was launched 23 December 2017 on a H-IIA rocket alongside the GCOM-C (Shikisai) satellite to a 630 km orbit, followed by orbit-lowering manoeuvres by a combination of chemical propulsion and aerobraking, with final operation at an altitude below 180 km.

SLATS was operated at 7 altitudes: 271.5 and 216.8 km each for 38 days, and 250, 240, 230, 181.1 and 167.4 km each for 7 days. At 167.4 km the RCS thrusters were used in addition to the ion thruster to maintain altitude.

The operation of the satellite was finished on 30 September 2019, and it was decommissioned in orbit on 1 October 2019 by terminating the communication radio and power. The satellite deorbited 1 October 2019.

On 30 December 2019, Guinness World Records recognized Tsubame's achievement, which reached the lowest altitude ever among Earth observation satellites.

References

External links 

 JAXA SLATS page, has images and more details
 JAXA Space Technology Directorate I SLATS page 

Satellites of Japan
Satellites in very low Earth orbit
Spacecraft launched in 2017
2017 in Japan
Spacecraft launched by H-II rockets
Spacecraft decommissioned in 2019